Allexon Saravia Zambrano (born 22 September 2000) is a footballer who plays as a defender for Primera División club Águila. Born in the United States, he represents the El Salvador national team.

Career 
Savaria previously spent 4 years in the D.C. United Academy, totaling 56 match appearances and scoring 6 goals.

Saravia joined Loudoun United in June 2019. He was re-signed by Loudoun ahead of the 2020 season.

Career statistics

Club

Notes

References

2000 births
Living people
Salvadoran footballers
El Salvador international footballers
El Salvador youth international footballers
American soccer players
American people of Salvadoran descent
Salvadoran expatriate footballers
Association football defenders
Loudoun United FC players
USL Championship players
Soccer players from Virginia
American sportspeople of Salvadoran descent
Citizens of El Salvador through descent